Bruguiera hainesii is a species of mangrove in the family Rhizophoraceae. It is native to Indonesia, Malaysia, Singapore and Papua New Guinea.

Status
It is listed as critically endangered by the IUCN.

References

hainesii
Central Indo-Pacific flora
Mangroves